The discography of Bullet for My Valentine, a Welsh heavy metal band, is composed of seven studio albums, four live albums, five EPs and four video albums, from which thirty-two singles and thirty-one music videos have been released. In addition, a live DVD has also been released. In 2002, the band secured a five-album deal with Sony BMG. The band has stated that their music is influenced by classic metal acts such as Metallica, Iron Maiden, and Slayer. The band is part of the Cardiff music scene.

The band has sold over 1.7 million albums in the United States and over 3 million albums worldwide and are the most-successful act in the Kerrang! Awards category of "Best British Band" with three wins.

Studio albums

Extended plays

Singles

Videos

Video albums
Rock am Ring 2006 (2006)
The Poison: Live at Brixton (2006)
Scream Aim Fire: Live at London Alexandria (2009)
Live from Brixton: Chapter Two (2017)

Music videos

References

External links
 

Heavy metal group discographies
 
Discographies of British artists